Chitra Magimairaj (born 7 April 1973, Bangalore), is an Indian professional player of snooker, English billiards, and pool. She is a two-time World Ladies Billiards and Snooker Association World Champion (2006, 2007), a two-time national pool champion, and more recently the World Women's Senior Snooker Championship (2014).  She has also been a national-class amateur cricket and field hockey player.

Her highest  are 91 at snooker and 49 at English billiards.

Early life
Born in Bangalore, India, Magimairaj was educated at St. Anne's Girls High School, and graduated from Teresian College, Mysore.  She started playing cricket and field hockey at a young age.

Career
On 22 April 2014, Magimairaj won the World Women's Senior Snooker Championship, after defeating Alena Asmolava of Belarus, in Leeds, UK.

Magimairaj was the first Indian woman cueist to win a medal in Asian Games and Asian Indoor Games, the First Indian woman to have won two World Billiards Championships (women's division) titles (in 2006 and 2007) and the first Indian to win an Australian Open Women's Snooker Championship (2008).

Inn 2007 she received a Kempegowda Award and an Ekalavya Award.

Other sports
Magimairaj played cricket for Falcon Sports Club under Shanta Rangaswamy, and represented Karnataka, which won the South Zone Cricket Championship in the year 1989.

She played field hockey for Sports Hostel Mysore for seven years, and represented Karnataka in sub-junior, junior, and senior nationals, the All-India Inter-University Invitation Cup, and the South Zone Championship.

Titles and achievements

English billiards

Snooker

Pool

References

External links
 Player profile at CueSportsIndia

Living people
1973 births
Sportspeople from Bangalore
Cue sports players at the 2006 Asian Games
Cue sports players at the 2010 Asian Games
Cue sports players from Karnataka
Indian pool players
Indian players of English billiards
Indian snooker players
Female pool players
Female players of English billiards
Female snooker players
Asian Games competitors for India
World champions in English billiards